The Queen's University Faculty of Law is a professional faculty of Queen's University at Kingston in Kingston, Ontario, Canada. According to the 2013 Maclean's Magazine Law School Rankings, Queen’s is tied for third among law schools in Canada.

While the tradition of legal education at Queen's University heralds back nearly 150 years in 1861, the law school as it currently exists was officially established in 1957. Past and current professors at Queen's such as William Lederman, Toni Pickard, Gary Trotter, Allan Manson, Nick Bala and Don Stuart are routinely cited in Supreme Court of Canada and other appellate decisions. As consultants, advisors, and project directors, Queen's Law professors have made substantial contributions to various provincial and national law commissions, as well as national and international organizations.

Queen's Law School is housed in the Law Building (formerly known as Sir John A. Maconald Hall). The building was inaugurated by Prime Minister John G. Diefenbaker in 1960, and was completely renovated in 2003. It houses the William R. Lederman Law Library, named after the former dean and respected scholar, which contains over 150,000 legal volumes.

History

The first Faculty of Law at Queen's University was established in 1861, two years later awarding its first honorary Doctor of Laws degree to John A. Macdonald who would go on to serve as Canada's first Prime Minister. The first Dean of Law, Alexander Campbell, was also a "Father of Confederation".  This early faculty only lasted a few years and efforts were made to revive the law school in 1880 although, again, after graduating a number of students the law school closed after a number of years largely because the Law Society of Upper Canada refused to recognize degrees awarded outside of Osgoode Hall. The modern law school was founded in 1957 with James Corry, Stuart Ryan and Daniel Soberman as the founding members of the faculty. In 1958, William Lederman, the pre-eminent constitutional law scholar of his era, became the first dean of the new law school.

Kingston was the long-time home of Prime Minister Macdonald; as a lawyer, he advocated many famed cases in this city.  In honour of its relationship to this Prime Minister, the Queen's University Faculty of Law building was originally named Macdonald Hall. It is located on Union Street, designated to symbolize the union of Upper Canada and Lower Canada in 1841. The name was changed in 2020 after Macdonald's role in the establishment of the Canadian Indian residential school system led to community demands for the name change.

Queen's Law continues to be a unique institution within the Canadian legal academic environment by, for instance, running the only Canadian legal study abroad program at the Queen's University campus at Herstmonceux Castle in East Sussex, England.

The Faculty of Law of Queen’s University at Kingston's Arms were registered with the Canadian Heraldic Authority on April 20, 2007. The crest of Queen's University's Faculty of Law consists of a sword and the scales of justice superimposed on the Cross of St. Andrew. Professor Stuart Ryan, one of the law school's founding faculty members, gave the school its motto – Soit Droit Fait. The phrase has a double meaning. It is a statement of the power and creative potential inherent in the law that was used by medieval kings when assenting to bills passed by Parliament – "let the law be made."  It is also an expression of the commitment to justice and decency implicit in the ideal of legality – "let right be done."

Academics

Admissions
Most accepted applicants have completed a four-year university program. The preference is to accept those applicants who have an honours undergraduate degree, and many admitted students have attained graduate degrees as well. Acceptance into Queen's Law is highly competitive, with about 2,400 applicants vying for around 160 positions. The average LSAT score of accepted applicants is 163 and the average undergraduate GPA is 3.73 in the general category.

The Faculty Board and Queen's University Senate voted to change the LL.B. degree to a Juris Doctor (J.D.) designation to reflect the fact that the vast majority of Queen's Faculty of Law's graduates enter the program with at least one university degree.

Joint degrees
The Faculty of Law at Queen's University currently offers a Juris Doctor program (J.D.) and a graduate program in law (LL.M.). In addition, combined degree programs include a Masters of Industrial Relations (M.I.R.), Masters of Public Administration (M.P.A.),Masters of Arts in Economics (M.A.) and a Queen's School of Business Masters of Business Administration (M.B.A.). The Faculty of law also has a doctoral program.

Clinical programs
Practical experience is a major component of legal education at Queen's, with mandatory advocacy courses and a large proportion of the student body being engaged in one of the school's five pro bono legal clinics: Queen's Legal Aid, the Prison Law Clinic, the Queen's Business Law Clinic, Queen's Elder Law Clinic, and Queen's Family Law Clinic. The Clinics are located a short distance from the Queen's campus in downtown Kingston. In these programs students gain practical legal training and experience in the realm of social justice and advocacy. Queen's Law is the only university in Canada with a prison law clinic.

International opportunities
Queen's Law also offers exchange programs, visiting scholars and guest lecturers from law schools and legal institutions around the world, and the International Law Spring Program at the International Study Centre (ISC) at Herstmonceux Castle in East Sussex, England.

The International Law Spring Program at Herstmonceaux Castle offers an academic program in international law taught by practitioners and academics from around the world. The international law certificate program is split into three streams: International Public Law, International Business Law and Comparative International Law, and is open to accredited law schools in Canada and the United States and international universities with which Queen's is an exchange partner.

Taking advantage of the ISC's location, the International Law Spring Program includes a number of field trips to international institutions in Europe including the World Trade Organization in Geneva, the Canadian Mission to the European Union in Brussels, the International Criminal Tribunal in the Hague, the United Nations Office in Geneva, and the OECD in Paris, among other key institutions.

Alumni
Notable Queen's Faculty of Law alumni include:

 Justice Harvey Brownstone (1980) – Ontario Provincial Court Justice and author of "Tug of War"
 Jock Climie (1998) – Lawyer, former CFL player
 Justice Thomas A. Cromwell (1976) – Retired Supreme Court of Canada Justice
 Justice David Stratas (1984) – Current Federal Court of Appeal Justice
 Mike Gillis (1989) – General Manager of the Vancouver Canucks
 David Lloyd Johnston (1966) – President of the University of Waterloo – Governor General of Canada
 Dhaman Kissoon – barrister and cricketer
Winston George Nesrallah Tannis – Author-Artist, Editor, Publisher, Philosopher-Jurists, Arbitrator, Mediator, Entrepreneur, Executive Chair
 Jean L. MacFarland – Court of Appeal for Ontario
 David Paul Smith (1970) – Canadian Senator
 Robert M. Nelson – Lawyer

Faculty
William Lederman  – OC (January 6, 1916 – July 26, 1992) was a Canadian constitutional scholar and the first dean of Queen's University Faculty of Law.
Nicholas Bala - leading Canadian scholar on Family Law, frequently cited by the Supreme Court of Canada.
Don Stuart - Leading Canadian scholar on Criminal Law, frequently cited by the Supreme Court of Canada.

See also
List of law schools in Canada

References

External links
Queen's Law School Website
Canadian Lawyer magazine's 2005 ranking of Canadian Law Schools
Canadian Lawyer magazine's 2005 Canadian lawyer's compensation survey
 CanLII - Canadian Legal Information Institute

Law schools in Canada
Faculty of Law
Queen's University Faculty of Law